Shahid Hussain Bhutto is a Pakistani politician who was a member of the National Assembly of Pakistan from 2002 to 2013.

Political career
He was elected to the National Assembly of Pakistan from Constituency NA-207 (Larkana-IV) as a candidate of Pakistan Peoples Party (PPP) in 2002 Pakistani general election. He received 54,349 votes and defeated Khalid Mehmood Soomro.

He was re-elected to the National Assembly from Constituency NA-204 (Larkana) as a candidate of PPP in 2008 Pakistani general election. He received 81,439 votes and defeated Ghinwa Bhutto.

He ran for the seat of the National Assembly as an independent candidate from Constituency NA-204 (Larkana) in 2013 Pakistani general election but was unsuccessful. He received 3,801 votes and lost the seat to Ayaz Soomro. In the same election, he ran for the seat of the Provincial Assembly of Sindh as an independent candidate from Constituency PS-36 (Larkana-II) but was unsuccessful. He received 1,067 and lost the seat to Nisar Ahmad Khuhro.

References

Living people
Pakistani MNAs 2008–2013
Pakistani MNAs 2002–2007
Year of birth missing (living people)